Janów  is a village in the administrative district of Gmina Stare Babice, within Warsaw West County, Masovian Voivodeship, in east-central Poland.

In 2010, the village had a population of 383.

References

Villages in Warsaw West County